Jasmine Kaur Sandlas is an Indian-American singer, rapper, television personality, performer, songwriter who mainly sings Punjabi songs. She was also featured on the TEDx Talks, MTV Coke Studio and spoken word platforms. Jasmine Sandlas is an independent artist.

Sandlas, born in Jalandar, Punjab, India and raised in Stockton, California always aspired to pursue a career in singing. Sandlas' first song was "Muskan" (2008) became a hit. In 2014, she began her Bollywood playback singing career with the song "Yaar Na Miley" for the film Kick. Upon its release, "Yaar Na Miley" went viral and topped the charts and Sandlas received wide critical acclaim for her singing style as well as earned several awards, including "Most popular song of year 2016 - PTC Punjabi Film Awards" and Screen Award for Best Female Playback. Moreover, she is also known as the Queen of Punjabi music industry among her fans due to her unique style of singing and lifestyle.

Early life and background 
Jasmine Kaur Sandlas was born in Jalandhar, Punjab, India to a Lubana, Sikh family. Her mother is the one who put her on the stage to sing at an early age, during her school days she participated in many song competitions and then that was the time when she got influenced by many Punjabi folk singers. At the age of 13, she with her family, migrated to California and got inspired by the West Coast music. She was only 16 when she began writing songs.

Music career 
Her first song, 'Muskan', from the album 'The Diamond', written by Lalie Gill was great success worldwide. In 2012, she did an album 'Gulabi' with rapper Bohemia. After the launch of "Gulabi" album, she started receiving recognition from the mainstream Punjabi music industry. In 2015, Jasmine Sandlas was out with single Punjab De Javak. Jasmine's career began with underground album 'The Diamond' in 2008. Her Bollywood playback singing career began with Kick, for which she did the song called "Devil-Yaar Naa Miley" with Yo Yo Honey Singh.

2012:Gulabi
In 2012, the Gulabi album was launched by Sony Music Company.

2014:Entry into Bollywood 
In 2014 she debuted in Bollywood as a playback singer in movie Kick alongside Yo Yo Honey Singh.

2016 
Jasmine has given two singles "Ishq Da Sutta" and "Raat Jashan Di" for the movies One Night Stand and Zorawar, respectively.

Jasmine is also part of the TV series on women-empowerment called Angels of Rock, by MTV India. Jasmine along with three other artists biked from Mumbai to the Wagah border (travelling through Gujarat, Rajasthan, UP, Punjab along the way), covering places in rural as well as urban India. Along the way, they met some inspiring women who have scripted their own success stories in varied fields and are using their voice to speak up and discuss issues that urgently need attention. Each episode will also end with a special song. The first episode of season 1, aired on 31 July 2016.

2020:What's In A Name
In 2020, the third album What's In A Name was launched on Jasmine Sandlas own YouTube Channel. The album “What’s In A Name” contains 8 songs. The music is produced by Intense and Hark. Jasmine Sandlas perfectly planned this album. Her fans already knew about the album through her Instagram profile she created the Instagram theme with the art and animation. There is a lot of hard work done by her team also. The illustration was designed by Diksha and animation is done by VFX kalakaar.

2021: The Great Punjabi Experiment
TGME was an experiment that Jasmine Sandlas started to observe if her predictions ,about what kind of music people like ,were right or wrong. It consisted of 9 songs. First Song “Gaana challe ya na” was released on 8th March 2021 whereas last song “Dil Tutteya” was released on 10th February 2022.

2022
Jasmine Sandlas released an EP called “Tini” on her birthday that concluded 4 songs: “Yakeen” , “Kehnda hi Nahi” , “Hava vich” and “Kehri gali”.

Sandlas released a single called “Jee Jeha Karda” on 7th of November.

2023
Jasmine’s first project of the year was called “Jehri ve” which also had Gippy Grewal’s vocals in it. The track was from the movie “mitraan da naa chalda” and came out on 30th January.

“Ittar” , written by Jaani , was released on March 7. B praak composed the music.

Discography

Soundtrack albums

Singles (music)

Studio albums

Collaboration albums

Coke Studio (India)

MTV Spoken Word

Television 
MTV INDIA "Angels Of Rock"

Awards and nominations

See also 
 List of Indian playback singers

References

External links 
 
 

American women singers
Bollywood playback singers
Indian women playback singers
Indian women songwriters
Indian voice actresses
Living people
Singers from California
People from Jalandhar
American musicians of Indian descent
American women musicians of Indian descent
American women songwriters
Songwriters from California
Women musicians from Punjab, India
Singers from Punjab, India
Folk-pop singers
21st-century American women
1990 births